Benjam "Benjamin" Vanninen (29 June 1921 – 22 July 1975) was a Finnish cross-country skier. He won a bronze medal in the 50 km event at the 1948 Winter Olympics, 20 seconds ahead of his elder brother Pekka. Vanninen never won a Finnish title, but won the 50 km race at the Lahti Ski Games in 1946 and 1948 and at Ounasvaara in 1946 and 1947. After retiring from competitions he worked as a customs officer, merchant, and manufacturer of skating equipment and ski wax.

Cross-country skiing results
All results are sourced from the International Ski Federation (FIS).

Olympic Games
 1 medal – (1 bronze)

References

External links

1921 births
1975 deaths
People from Sortavalsky District
Finnish male cross-country skiers
Cross-country skiers at the 1948 Winter Olympics
Olympic cross-country skiers of Finland
Olympic bronze medalists for Finland
Olympic medalists in cross-country skiing
Medalists at the 1948 Winter Olympics
20th-century Finnish people